Cheshmeh Malek (also known as Darreh Dīvīn, Dewīn, Dīrchīn, Dīvīn, and Dīvjīn) is a village in Abaru Rural District, in the Central District of Hamadan County, Hamadan Province, Iran. At the 2006 census, its population was 252, in 65 families.

Language 
The linguistic composition of the village:

References 

Populated places in Hamadan County